Anne Valente is an American writer. Her debut short story collection, By Light We Knew Our Names, won the Dzanc Books Short Story Prize and was released in September 2014. She is also the author of the fiction chapbook, An Elegy for Mathematics. Her fiction has appeared in One Story, Hayden's Ferry Review, Ninth Letter, The Kenyon Review and  others. In 2014, Anne was the Georges and Anne Borchardt Scholar at the Sewanee Writers' Conference. Her essays have been published in The Believer, Electric Literature and The Washington Post.

In 2016, Valente's debut novel, Our Hearts Will Burn Us Down, was published by William Morrow/HarperCollins. Her second novel, The Desert Sky Before Us, was published by HarperCollins in 2019.

Valente is currently represented by Emma Patterson at Brandt & Hochman

She has taught creative writing and creative non-fiction at Bowling Green State University, McNeese State University, University of Illinois at Urbana–Champaign, University of Utah, University of Cincinnati, and Santa Fe University of Art and Design.

Anne Valente is currently an associate professor in the department of Literature and Creative Writing at Hamilton College.

Education
BA, English and Film Studies, Washington University in St. Louis
MS, Journalism, University of Illinois Urbana-Champaign College of Media
MFA, Creative Writing, Bowling Green State University
PhD, Creative Writing, University of Cincinnati

Reception

About her 2014 short story collection By Light We Knew Our Names Catherine Carberry of the Paris Review Daily,  wrote: "Valente slides between realism and fabulism, and her imaginative leaps alone are noteworthy—but even more so is the heart that beats throughout these stories" Sadye Teiser of The Rumpus wrote: "All of the stories in this luminous debut straddle the line between the known and the unknowable. By Light We Knew Our Names illustrates the fact that, whether it’s the discovery of your own identity or the inexplicability of others, the world is full of secrets, and we feel most alive when we are trying (futilely) to uncover them. It’s this sense of mystery that torments and sustains us." Valente's debut novel, Our Hearts Will Burn Us Down, was named one of the most necessary books for the end of 2016 by Ploughshares.

Awards
2017 A Personal History of Arson, The Best Small Fictions
2015 Featured Author, One Story Literary Debutante Ball
2014 Notable Debut Author, The Masters Review.
2012 Copper Nickel Short Story Prize
2011 Dzanc Books Short Story Prize

Selected works

Books
 The Desert Sky Before Us (2019, William Morrow) 
 Our Hearts Will Burn Us Down (2016, William Morrow) 
 By Light We Knew Our Names (2014, Dzanc Books) 
 An Elegy for Mathematics (2013, Origami Zoo Press; 2017 reissue, Bull City Press)

Short stories

References

Living people
American women short story writers
21st-century American women writers
Writers from St. Louis
21st-century American short story writers
Year of birth missing (living people)
University of Illinois Urbana-Champaign College of Media alumni
Bowling Green State University alumni
Washington University in St. Louis alumni
University of Cincinnati alumni
Hamilton College (New York) faculty
McNeese State University faculty
University of Utah faculty